Hollowman is an EP by Swedish death metal band Entombed, released via Earache Records in 1993. The 1996 reissue featured the bonus track "God of Thunder" which was previously released on the "Out of Hand" single.

Track listing

Credits
Tomas Skogsberg – producer, engineer
Nicke Andersson – guitar, design, artwork, drums
Uffe Cederlund – guitar, tambourine
Lars Rosenberg – bass
Alex Hellid – guitar
Lars-Göran Petrov- vocals
 Entombed – producer, main performer

Entombed (band) albums
1993 EPs